Hermia is a science park near Tampere University of Technology (TUT). Hermia is located in Hervanta, a suburb of Tampere, Finland. Hermia is also acting as a technology centre for its region.

Hermia offers office space and facilities for both small technology startups and larger companies. It consists of 100,000 m2 of office space and is home to 150 companies and research organizations, for example to many research and development units of the cell phone manufacturer Nokia.

Products developed in the offices of Hermia have included the first Nokia Communicator mobile phone, as well as Nokia's first camera-phone. The site is also home to one of the offices of Nokia Research Center, where among other activities the EFR and WB-AMR codecs were developed.

External links 
 Hermia

Buildings and structures in Tampere
Science parks in Finland